Northview High School may refer to:
Northview Heights Secondary School, Toronto District School Board, Ontario
Northview High School (Brazil, Indiana)
Northview High School (Sylvania, Ohio)
Northview High School (California), Covina-Valley Unified School District, California
Northview High School (Georgia), Johns Creek, Georgia
Northview High School (Dothan, Alabama)
Northview High School (Century, Florida)
Northview High School (Michigan),  Plainfield Township, Kent County, Michigan, a suburb of Grand Rapids